Henry Berg-Brousseau (March 9, 1998 — December 16, 2022)  was an American transgender rights activist. He attended the George Washington University and was a founding member of the Delta Lambda Phi Alpha chapter.  He was the deputy press secretary for politics for the Human Rights Campaign. His testimony in 2015 regarding a Bathroom bill under consideration by the Kentucky legislature helped prevent its passage. His mother is Kentucky state senator Karen Berg.

References

1998 births
2022 deaths
People from Louisville, Kentucky
Transgender men
American activists
Transgender rights activists
George Washington University alumni
2022 suicides
LGBT-related suicides
Suicides in Virginia